Gesta invisus, the false duskywing, is a species of spread-wing skipper in the family Hesperiidae. It was described by Arthur Gardiner Butler and Herbert Druce in 1872 and is found in Central and North America.

The MONA or Hodges number for Gesta invisus is 3943.

References

 Austin, George T., and Andrew D. Warren (2002). "Taxonomic notes on some Neotropical skippers (Lepidoptera: Hesperiidae): Pyrrhopyginae and Pyrginae". Dugesiana, vol. 9, no. 2, 15-49.
 Opler, Paul A. (1999). A Field Guide to Western Butterflies, Second Edition, xiv + 540.
 Opler, Paul A. & Andrew D. Warren (2005). Butterflies of North America, pt. 4: Scientific Names List for Butterfly Species of North America, north of Mexico, 80.
 Pelham, Jonathan P. (2008). "A catalogue of the butterflies of the United States and Canada with a complete bibliography of the descriptive and systematic literature". Journal of Research on the Lepidoptera, vol. 40, xiv + 658.

Further reading

 Arnett, Ross H. (2000). American Insects: A Handbook of the Insects of America North of Mexico. CRC Press.

External links

 Butterflies and Moths of North America
 NCBI Taxonomy Browser, Gesta invisus

Pyrginae